Mirko Pajčin (born 13 October 1966), known by his stage name Baja Mali Knindža, is a Bosnian Serb folk singer and songwriter. He is often described as part of the turbo-folk scene, and is known for his Serbian nationalist songs. His cousin was the pop-folk recording artist Ksenija Pajčin.

Pajčin is not to be mistaken with Nedeljko Bajić Baja (to whom he owes his nickname due to their physical resemblance), who is another Bosnian Serb folk singer.

Early life
Pajčin was born on 13 October 1966 into a Bosnian Serb family in the village of Gubin, near Livno, Bosnia and Herzegovina.

Pajčin moved to SR Serbia in 1980, and began singing in 1984 in Surčin.

Career
Baja won a 1989 competition for amateur singers in Livno and released his first album in 1991. His career began just as Yugoslavia was breaking up. Throughout the 1990s, he was known for his strong Serbian nationalism and nationalist songs supporting the Serbs during the Yugoslav wars; during the Croatian War of Independence he was dubbed Baja Mali-Knindža (literally meaning "Baja little Kninja" in reference to the de facto capital, Knin, of the Serbian ethnic breakaway state of Serbian Krajina within Croatia and its armed force and also the Serb paramilitary unit, Kninjas). His first professional success was the song "Врати се Војводо" (Come Back, Voivode), in which he appealed to Serbian World War II Chetnik commander Momčilo Đujić to come back to the areas of the Croatian Krajina and help lift the spirits of the Croatian Serbs. He said that he would never consider going to Croatia as he claimed that Croatian soldiers "burned down his house and desecrated his ancestors' graves".

Baja performs at "Кочићев збор" (Kočić's Assembly) in Zmijanje near Banja Luka in mid-August every year, and he usually attracts tens of thousands of people. Since Operation Storm, Pajčin has written many songs about his dream of the Serb people returning to live in territories now inhabited by Croats following the Croatian War for Independence.

Pajčin  is controversial due to his Serbian nationalism and Serbian far-right views and bias in lyrics. Most of his songs are condemned in non-Serb parts of Bosnia and Croatia because of their xenophobic lyrics, which often reference war leaders during the Yugoslav wars. For example, his song "Ne volim te Alija" describes his strong dislike for the Bosnian wartime president Alija Izetbegović.

One song titled "Ćuti, Ćuti Ujko!" (the song and music video featuring Serbian rock star Bora Đorđević) contains the lyrics " Shut up Shut up  Ujko(Ustaša/Croat) I will kill you" as well as "Shut up, shut up, mujo (Bosnian Muslim), I will kill you". He has also sung "I don't like people who like the HDZ", which included the lyrics "Fuck their šahovnica".

In another song titled "Tata", he sings about how his dad is a war criminal, and how no one is brave enough to arrest him ("no one has the balls to take him to court!")

Despite many of his songs having a nationalistic lyrical theme, he is also known for his often humorous non-political songs such as "Umri Baba" and "Poker Aparat".

Personal life
Pajčin lives with his wife, three daughters and three sons in Zemun. Besides his native language, he also speaks English and Russian. His mother and father live in a newly built house in Surčin.

Baja is a supporter of the Serbian Radical Party, and has sung at the party's conventions. He also released an album, Српским радикалима (To the Serbian Radicals, 1998), which glorifies the SRS and its leader Vojislav Šešelj.

His cousin Ksenija Pajčin, pop-folk recording artist, was murdered by her ex-boyfriend on March 16, 2010. Later that same year Pajačin released the song "Spavaj, kraljice" (Sleep, Queen) in her memory. He said that he was very "shaken" by her death.

Discography

Solo

Ne dam Krajine (1991)
Stan'te paše i Ustaše (1992)
Živjeće ovaj narod (1993)
Sve za srpstvo, srpstvo ni za šta (1993)
Još se ništa ne zna (1993)
Rat i mir (1993)
Kockar bez sreće (1993)
Pobediće istina (1994)
Igraju se delije (1995)
Idemo dalje (1995)
Zbogom oružje (1995)
Ne dirajte njega (1997)
Povratak u budućnost (1998)
Srpskim radikalima (1998)
Biti il ne biti (1999)
Život je tamo đe su tvrdi kurčevi (1999)
Zaljubljen u mlad kurac (2000)
Đe si legendo (2001)
Zbogom pameti (2002)
Baja Mali Knindža: uživo (2003)
Luda Žurka - uživo (2003)
Za kim zvona zvone (2006)
Gluvi barut (2007)
Idemo malena (2011)
Uz kurac niz kurac (i druge igre) (2011)
Lesi se vraća kući (2012)
Govor duše (2014)

With Braća sa Dinare band

Braća sa Dinare (1994)
Bila jednom jedna zemlja (1995)
Plači voljena zemljo (1996)
Ja se svoga, ne odričem groba (1997)
Idemo do kraja (1998)

References

External links
Discography at Discogs

1966 births
Living people
People from Livno
Serbian nationalists
Serbs of Bosnia and Herzegovina
21st-century Serbian male singers
Serbian folk singers
BN Music artists
Serbian turbo-folk singers
20th-century Serbian male singers
Nationalist musicians